Can't Control Myself may refer to:

 "Can't Control Myself" (Wa Wa Nee song), 1988
 "Can't Control Myself" (Taeyeon song), 2022
 "I Can't Control Myself", song by the Troggs, 1966